Arnold Redler (September 1875 – October 1958) was the British founder of the conveying company Redler Limited in Stroud, Gloucestershire in 1920 and the father of the En-Masse principle of conveying bulk materials.

Early years
Born in Bishops Nympton, Devon to Thomas John Redler a Corn Miller and Georgina Relder, Arnold grew up as the second youngest of 6 children at the family home of Bathpool Mill in West Monkton. His father bought the mill when Arnold was 14 from Captain George Beadon.

References

British businesspeople
1875 births
1958 deaths